Raymond George Herb (January 22, 1908 – October 1, 1996) was an American professor of nuclear physics at the University of Wisconsin–Madison. He was known for building electrostatic accelerators.  His work influenced the Manhattan Project, which built the first nuclear weapons.  In 1960, the University of Sao Paulo awarded him an honorary doctorate. He won the Bonner Prize in 1968. He started a company called NEC that manufactures electrostatic accelerators.  He was also a member of the National Academy of Sciences.

University of Wisconsin now holds a seminar series in his memory.

Sources 
 Complete biography at National Academy of Sciences 
 University of Wisconsin–Madison Nuclear Experimental Physics Group
 University of Wisconsin–Madison R. G. Herb Seminars
 University of Wisconsin–Madison Nuclear Physics
 The Pelletron Accelerator
 Manhattan Project
 World Sci Books
 Cas.web.cern.ch
 University of Wisconsin–Madison Engineers' Day
 Barschall, Henry H. Raymond George Herb
 Electrostatic Accelerator Development at Wisconsin

References

1996 deaths
1908 births
American nuclear physicists
Members of the United States National Academy of Sciences
Fellows of the American Physical Society